Jogin I is a mountain of the Garhwal Himalaya in Uttarakhand India.The elevation of Jogin I is  and its prominence is . It is 94th highest located entirely within the Uttrakhand. Nanda Devi, is the highest mountain in this category. It lies 5.4 km east of Gangotri III and 7.4 km west of Bhrigupanth . It lies 2.2 km South of Jogin II. Its nearest higher neighbor is Gangotri III . It is located 6.9 km NW of Thalaysagar  and 8.8 km NW lies Gangotri I .

Gangotri National Park
The entire surrounding area are protected within the  Gangotri National Park, one of the largest conservation area in India. The Gangotri National Park is home to several world-class treks, including Gangotri Gomukh Tapoban Nandanvan, Kerdarnath Vasuki tal trek, Har ki dun valley trek,  Badrinath to Satopanth tal trek, Gangotri to Kedar tal trek, Gangotri to Badrinath trek via Kalindi khal and many more.

Climbing history

Jogin I was first climbed on 22 June 1970, by the students of 19th Advance Course of NIM led by successful Indian Everester its Principal Colonel J. C. Joshi.

A British Expedition led by Paul Farmer in September - October 2000 made an unsuccessful attempt. This 6 member British team attempted the peak in the Kedarganga valley in the post monsoon season. They had to turn back from 5,900 m due to too much unconsolidated snow.

A six-member team of Walt Kaskel, Joseph Mazzotta, Dick Osborn, Dick Painter, Ron Rickman and Tony Lewis as leader began their two-day trek up the Kedar Ganga from Gangotri on May 30 and placed their Base Camp above the Kedar Tal lake, at 15,000 feet. they made Camp I at 17,500 feet on June 3, after climbing the right side of the icefall they established Camp II at 18,500 feet. On June 6, they left Camp II and through knee-deep snow they reached the summit.

Neighboring and subsidiary peaks
neighboring or subsidiary peaks of Jogin I:
 Thalay Sagar: 
 Meru Peak: 
 Manda III: 
 Shivling: 
 Gangotri I: 
 Gangotri II: 
 Gangotri III: 
 Jogin II:

Glaciers and rivers
On the southern side lies jogin Glacier and Ratangiran Glacier. On the eastern side lies Kedar Bamak and on the western side lies Rudugaira Bamak. Kedar Ganga emerges from Kedar bamak and joins Bhagirathi River near Gangotri. Rudugaira nala emerges from Rudugaira Bamak also joins Bhagirathi river close to Gangotri. Both the glacier drain down to Bhagirathi River near Gangotri. On the southern side Jogin Glacier joins Khatling Glacier so is Ratangiran Glacier. From Khatling Glacier emerges Bhilangana River that also joins Bhgirathi river near Tehri one of the main tributaries of river Ganga. Bhagirathi joins the Alaknanda River the other main tributaries of river Ganga at Dev Prayag and called Ganga there after.

See also

 List of Himalayan peaks of Uttarakhand

References

Mountains of Uttarakhand
Six-thousanders of the Himalayas
Geography of Chamoli district